Chris Foggo (born 7 May 1982) is a Bermudian cricketer. He is a right-handed batsman. He played two first-class matches for Bermuda in the 2005 ICC Intercontinental Cup and four List A matches in the 2005 ICC Trophy.

References

External links

1982 births
Living people
People from Hamilton, Bermuda
Bermudian cricketers
Bermuda One Day International cricketers
Bermuda Twenty20 International cricketers